Ventimiglia railway station  is the main station in the Italian town of Ventimiglia. It is at the end of three rail routes: the Genoa–Ventimiglia line, the Cuneo–Ventimiglia line and the Marseille–Ventimiglia line. It plays an important role not only in rail transport in Liguria but also in Italy. Despite being an important station, it is partially in disrepair.

The station is managed by Rete Ferroviaria Italiana (RFI). However, the commercial area of the passenger building is managed by Centostazioni. Italian train services to and from the station are operated by Trenitalia. Each of these companies is a subsidiary of Ferrovie dello Stato (FS), Italy's state-owned rail company.

French train services to and from Ventimiglia are operated by the SNCF.

Location
Ventimiglia railway station is situated in Piazza Cesare Battisti, just north of the centre of the city.

History
The station was opened at the end of 1871 and renamed Ventimiglia International station in 1882, with the construction of a new passenger building with a glass roof over the tracks. This roof was later superseded by the current building, designed by the architect Roberto Narducci (who also designed 40 other Italian stations), which reflects, like other public buildings in Ventimiglia (especially the town hall and the gymnasium), the typical lines of Italian rationalist architecture.

Overview
The station consists of seven through tracks for passenger services, all equipped with platforms and connections to an underpass. There are many sidings for storing passenger carriages and a locomotive shed.

Trains depart from here to several parts of Italy and France (TER from Cannes and Grasse to Ventimiglia, InterCity from Ventimiglia to Milan and Rome).

Ventimiglia station is electrified at 1.5 kV DC. This may seem surprising, because the Italian railway system is electrified at 3 kV DC, and the Marseille–Ventimiglia line is electrified at 25 kV 50 Hz AC. However, the locomotives operating on the line into France have to be multi-system anyway, because Marseille railway station is also electrified at 1.5 kV. The Italian trains operate in the station area at half power.

Train services
The station is served by the following service(s):

Intercity services Ventimiglia - Savona - Genoa - La Spezia - Pisa - Livorno - Rome
Intercity services Ventimiglia - Savona - Genoa - Milan
Regional services (Treno regionale) Ventimiglia - Savona - Genoa - Sestri Levante - La Spezia - San Stefano di Magra
Local services (Treno regionale) Fossano - Cuneo - Breil sur Roya - Ventimiglia
Local services (TER Provence-Alpes-Côte-d'Azur) Grasse/Mandelieu - Cannes - Nice - Monaco - Ventimiglia

See also

History of rail transport in Italy
List of railway stations in Liguria
Rail transport in Italy
Railway stations in Italy

Notes

External links

Province of Imperia
Railway stations in Liguria
Railway stations in France opened in 1871
TER Provence-Alpes-Côte-d'Azur